Shusha District is one of the 66 districts of Azerbaijan. It is located in the west of the country and belongs to the Karabakh Economic Region. The district borders the districts of Khojaly, Lachin, and Khojavend. Its capital and largest city is Shusha. As of 2020, the district had a nominal population of 34,700.

History 
The district was formerly part of the Shusha District of the Nagorno-Karabakh Autonomous Oblast (NKAO) of Azerbaijan SSR during the Soviet times. It was the only district of NKAO to have an Azerbaijani-majority.

The district came under the control of the Armenian forces during the First Nagorno-Karabakh War and was made part of the Shushi Province of the self-proclaimed Republic of Artsakh. However, in 2020, parts of the district, including its capital, Shusha, were recaptured by Azerbaijan in November 2020 following a three-day battle during the 2020 Nagorno-Karabakh war.

Notable residents
Mir Mohsun Navvab, artist and poet
Khurshidbanu Natavan, poet
Sadigjan, musician, inventor of the Azeri variety of tar
Gasim bey Zakir, poet
Khudadat bey Malik-Aslanov, scientist and politician
Najaf bey Vazirov, playwright and journalist
Bulbul, folk and opera singer
Bulbuljan, folk singer
 Muratsan (1854–1908), Armenian writer and novelist.
 Leo (1860–1932), Armenian historian.
 Stepan Aghajanian (1863–1940), Armenian painter.
 Hambardzum Arakelian (1865–1918), Armenian journalist and public activist.
 Alexander Atabekian (1868–1933), prominent Armenian anarchist.
 Vartan Sarkisov (1875–1955), Soviet-Armenian architect.
 Freidun Aghalyan (1876–1944), Armenian architect.
 Tuman Tumanian (1879–1906), Armenian liberation movement leader.
Abdurrahim Hagverdiyev, dramatist    
Yusif Vazir Chamanzaminli (12 September 1887 to 3 January 1943 in the GULAG, near Gorky, Russia), core author of the novel Ali and Nino, published under the pseudonym Kurban Said
Karim bey Mehmandarov, doctor and social activist
Khan Shushinski, folk singer
Shamsi Badalbeyli, theatre director and actor
 Suleyman Sani Akhundov, Azerbaijani playwright, journalist, children's author, and teacher (3 October 1875, Shusha – 29 March 1939, Baku) 
 Ahmad Agdamski, Azerbaijani opera singer, mugam singer and actor (5 January 1884, Shusha – 1 April 1954 Agdash)
 Soltan Hajibeyov, Azerbaijani composer and People's Artist of the USSR (5 May 1919 Shusha – 19 September 1974 Baku)
 Uzeyir Hajibeyov (1885–1948), founder of Azerbaijani composed music
 Jabbar Garyagdioglu, Azerbaijani folk singer (khananda) (31 March 1861  Shusha – 20 April 1944 Baku) 
 Seyid Shushinski, Azerbaijani folk singer (khananda) (12 April 1889, Horadiz – 1 November 1965, Baku)
 Arsen Terteryan (1882–1953), Soviet-Armenian scientist.
 Artashes Babalian (1886–1959), a politician of the First Republic of Armenia.
 Sahak Ter-Gabrielyan (1886–1937), Soviet-Armenian statesman.
 Hayk Gyulikekhvyan (1886–1951), Armenian literary critic.
 Ashot Hovhannisyan (1887–1972), Soviet-Armenian statesman and historian.
 Mikael Arutchian (1897–1961), Soviet-Armenian painter.
 Ivan Knunyants (1906–1990), Soviet-Armenian chemist.
 Gevork Kotiantz (1909–1996), Soviet-Armenian painter.
 Shamsi Badalbeyli (1911–1987), Soviet-Azerbaijani actor and theatre director.
 Nelson Stepanyan (1913–1944), Soviet-Armenian pilot and Lieutenant–Colonel of the Red Army.
 Gurgen Boryan (1915–1971), Soviet-Armenian poet and playwright.
 Seyran Ohanyan (born 1962), Armenian politician and military commander.
 Aram Manukian (1879–1919), Armenian revolutionary leader
 Feyzullah Mirza Qajar (1872–1920), prince of Iran's Qajar dynasty. Major general in the Russian Empire and the Azerbaijan Democratic Republic, later military figure and politician in Iran.
 Latif Karimov, Azerbaijani carpet designer known for his contributions to a variety of artistic fields.(17 November 1906, Shusha – 1991, Baku)
 Avan Yuzbashi, (1670s–1735), Armenian military and political leader during Davit Bek uprising (1720s)
 Molla Panah Vagif, Poet the minister of foreign affairs in the Karabakh Khanate
 Ibrahim Khalil Khan (1732–1806), Azerbaijani khan of the Karabakh Khanate.
 Mehdigulu Khan Vefa, lyrical poet of Azerbaijan, lieutenant colonel in the Russian Army, son of a famous Karabakh poet Khurshidbanu Natavan (1855 Shusha – 1900 1900 Tiflis)
 Mir Hasan Vazirov, Azerbaijani revolutionary and one of the 26 Baku Commissars

References 

 
Districts of Azerbaijan
Azerbaijani administrative divisions of Artsakh